Colonel Sir Henry Walton Ellis   (29 November 1782 – 20 June 1815) was a British soldier in the Napoleonic Wars.

Life
He was the son of Major General Joyner Ellis, and grandson of J. Joyner of Berkeley, Gloucestershire. He was born in Cambray, Cheltenham in 1782 and baptised 6 October 1783, almost a year later, in Worcester, England. His father, Joyner Ellis, had taken the name Ellis in consequence of his adoption by 'Governor' Henry Ellis, lieutenant governor of Georgia, 1758, who lived for some time at Lansdowne Place, Bath, and died at Naples in 1806. Joyner Ellis served successively in the 18th, old 89th, and 41st Foot, became lieutenant-colonel of the 23rd Royal Welsh Fusiliers in 1793, major-general in 1798 and died 1804. He was member of parliament for Worcester for some years. By his wife, whose maiden name was Walton, he had several children, the eldest of whom, Henry Walton Ellis, was born at Worcester in 1783, and immediately appointed an ensign in the 89th foot, of which Joyner Ellis was major.

The regiment, which had been chiefly recruited around Worcester, was disbanded at the peace a few months later, and the baby was put on half-pay; but brought on full pay again as an ensign, at the age of five, in the 41st Foot, of which Joyner Ellis had been appointed major on its reorganisation in 1787.

Military career
Young Ellis became a lieutenant in the 41st Foot in 1792, and captain in the 23rd Fusiliers on 20 January 1796. Joining the Fusiliers, a boy-captain of barely fourteen, he served with it in the descent on Ostend in 1798, in the 1799 Anglo-Russian invasion of Holland (wounded), in the Channel, at Ferrol and in the Mediterranean in 1800, in Egypt in 1801 (wounded, gold medal and rank of major), in Hanover in 1805, and at Copenhagen in 1807. A youthful veteran of twenty-five, he succeeded to the command of the first battalion of his regiment, without purchase, in Nova Scotia in 1808, and commanded it in the expedition against Martinique in 1809, where at the siege of Fort Bourbon he offered to take the flints out of his men's firelocks and carry the works with his fusiliers at the point of the bayonet, an enterprise which the commander-in-chief, Sir George Beckwith, refused to sanction.

He proceeded with his battalion to Portugal in 1810, and commanded it through the succeeding campaigns in the Peninsula and south of France, during which he repeatedly distinguished himself, particularly at the Battle of Albuera, on the occasion of the historic charge of the fusilier brigade, at the siege of Badajos in 1812 (wounded), and in the desperate fighting at the pass of Roncesvalles in the Pyrenees on 28 July 1813.

For his Peninsular services he was promoted to colonel and appointed Knight Commander of the Order of the Bath. Under his command the Royal Welsh Fusiliers joined the Duke of Wellington's army on the field of Waterloo the night before the battle, having made a forced march from Grammont.

They were in reserve during the greater part of 18 June, but were brought up into the front line on the left later in the day, and received several French charges in square. Here Ellis received a musket-ball through the right breast. Feeling faint he rode out of the square towards the rear, but in getting over a small ditch fell from his horse and sustained further injuries. He was carried to a neighbouring hovel and his wounds dressed. In the evening of 19 June, after the army had moved on, the hut caught fire. Ellis was rescued with great difficulty by Assistant-Surgeon Munro of his regiment, but not before he had received severe burns, to which he succumbed on the morning of 20 June 1815. He was buried at Waterloo.

Legacy and memorials

The officers and men of the Royal Welsh Fusiliers placed a monument, by the London sculptor, John Bacon, to his memory in Worcester Cathedral at a cost of £1,200.

Personal life
Ellis never married.
He left two sons, to whom the Duke of Wellington gave commissions. Of these the younger, Henry, died young on passage home from India. The elder, Francis Joyner Ellis, died a major in the 62nd foot at Moulmein in 1840. On his death the name of Ellis was assumed by a surviving brother of Major-general John Joyner Ellis, William Joyner, many years coroner of Gloucestershire.

A grant of arms was made to his family on 14 February 1817.

Notes

References
Attribution
 Endnotes:
Ellis's Notices of the Ellis's of England and France, 1855-66 (printed privately), page 154
Annual Army Lists, in most of which the name is incorrectly given as Henry 'Watson' Ellis

London Gazettes, various.

External links
  includes posthumous mention in dispatches by the Duke of Wellington.

1782 births
1815 deaths
Royal Welch Fusiliers officers
British Army personnel of the French Revolutionary Wars
Military personnel from Worcester, England
Knights Commander of the Order of the Bath
41st Regiment of Foot officers
British Army personnel of the Napoleonic Wars
British military personnel killed in action in the Napoleonic Wars
Military personnel from Gloucestershire